Sidonie Verschueren was a Belgian sprinter. She competed in the women's 100 metres at the 1928 Summer Olympics.

References

Year of birth missing
Year of death missing
Athletes (track and field) at the 1928 Summer Olympics
Belgian female sprinters
Belgian female high jumpers
Olympic athletes of Belgium
Place of birth missing